Kaye Freeman from Queensland is an Australian athlete and lawn bowler with an intellectual disability. At the 1992 Paralympic Games for Persons with Mental Handicap, she won a bronze medal.

Career

At the 1st World Games for Athletes with an Intellectual Disability in Härnösand, Sweden, she won three gold medals in Women's 200 m, Women's Javelin and Women's  Relay and a silver medal in the Women's 100 m. At the 1992 Paralympic Games for Persons with Mental Handicap in Madrid, Spain, she won a bronze medal in the Women's Javelin.

After her athletics career, she took up lawn bowls and has been the AUSRAPID Women's Open champion several times.

References

Australian female sprinters
Australian female javelin throwers
Intellectual Disability category Paralympic competitors
Athletes from Brisbane
Australian female bowls players
Living people
Year of birth missing (living people)
Competitors in athletics with intellectual disability
Sportspeople with intellectual disability
Paralympic medalists in athletics (track and field)
Paralympic bronze medalists for Australia
Medalists at the 1992 Summer Paralympics
Athletes (track and field) at the 1992 Summer Paralympics
Paralympic athletes of Australia